In enzymology, a secologanin synthase (was wrongly classified as  in the past) is an enzyme that catalyzes the chemical reaction

loganin + NADPH + H+ + O2  secologanin + NADP+ + 2 H2O

The 4 substrates of this enzyme are loganin, NADPH, H+, and O2, whereas its 3 products are secologanin, NADP+, and H2O.

This enzyme belongs to the family of oxidoreductases, specifically those acting on the CH-CH group of donor with oxygen as acceptor.  The systematic name of this enzyme class is loganin:oxygen oxidoreductase (ring-cleaving). This enzyme participates in indole and ipecac alkaloid biosynthesis.

References

 
 
 

EC 1.14.19
NADPH-dependent enzymes
Enzymes of unknown structure